Frank Anthony "Jelly" Jelincich (September 3, 1917 – June 27, 1992) was an outfielder in Major League Baseball. He played for the Chicago Cubs in 1941.

References

External links

1917 births
1992 deaths
Major League Baseball outfielders
Chicago Cubs players
Baseball players from San Jose, California
Nashville Vols players